Los Alamitos Unified School District (LAUSD) is a school district in Los Alamitos, Orange County, California. The school district area includes the communities of Los Alamitos, Rossmoor, Seal Beach, and Surfside. It also includes portions of Cypress. It also includes an area with a Long Beach street address.

History
The Los Alamitos Unified School District was founded in June 1979 after the voters pass a unification referendum breaking the secondary schools away from the Anaheim Union High School District.  One of the cochairman of the unification committee was elected to the board (See Mark Abrams) along with three Members of the Board of the then existing Los Alamitos Elementary school district. One of the newly elected members of the new school board was Mark Abrams a student at Los Alamitos High School and 18 years old. He is considered the youngest elected official in the history of the United States being elected just three months after his 18th birthday. He was also a current member of the student body and wound up eventually signing his own high school diploma.

Around 1987, Los Alamitos began a day care program from 6:30 AM to 6: PM for 24 students Who were enrolled in Los Alamitos elementary school. By 1993 the day care program served 800 children in grades Kindergarten through 8. The price was $2.50 per hour per child, with each child serving a weekly minimum of 10 hours; this price was lower than that of an average private program, which would charge $300 per month per child. The childcare program was entirely self-supported by the fees paid by parents. Shirley Horn, a former Los Alamitos teacher and principal who had become a consultant, designed the program, which offered activities including arts instruction, computer training, homework assistance, after-school recreation.

In 1993, several parents within the nearby Long Beach Unified School District (LBUSD) boundaries enrolled their children in the Los Alamitos day care program so that they could then use LBUSD district transfer rules, stating that parents may enroll their children at a school closest to their daycare provider even if the school is in another school district, to obtain an inter-district transfer from the Los Alamitos district and send their children to Los Alamitos schools. As a result, LBUSD was losing money, because state education funds were paid based on attendance. Horn said "It was never anyone's intention to make the (child-care) program a drawing card from other school districts. It did turn out that way." Gordon Dillow of the Los Angeles Times said "Although school officials say they do not track the racial make-up of their inter-district transfer students, the perception has been that many, perhaps most, of the Long Beach-to-Los Alamitos transfer students are Anglo." Whites were a minority in LBUSD, with 26% of the student body, while they were a majority at Los Alamitos USD, with 75% of the student body. LBUSD established its own afterschool programs so that parents could no longer use the loophole.

Demographics
In the 1992-1993 school year the district schools were about 75% White. During that school year, the Los Alamitos district had about 1,200 students from other school districts. 400 of them lived in the Long Beach Unified School District. Some students had parents working in the Los Alamitos district, and some attended the Los Alamitos daycare in order to go to Los Alamitos schools.
By 2020, the demographics of the district had changed dramatically to include students identifying themselves as White (43%), Hispanic (27%), Asian(14%), and two or more races (8.8%)

Superintendents 
 Andrew Pulver (2019 - Current)
Sherry Kropp (2011 - 2019)
 Greg Franklin (2007 - 2011)
 Carol Hart (1990 - 2007)

Schools

Secondary schools
High schools:
 Los Alamitos High School (traditional high school)
 Laurel High School (Continuation high school and adult school)
Middle schools:
 Sharon Christa McAuliffe Middle School
 Oak Middle School

Primary schools
 Hopkinson Elementary School
 Lee Elementary School
 Los Alamitos Elementary School
 McGaugh Elementary School
 Rossmoor Elementary School
 Jack L. Weaver Elementary School

Awards

California Department of Education - California Distinguished Schools
 Hopkinson Elementary School - 1993, 2000, 2008, 2014 
 Lee Elementary School - 1995, 2004, 2018
 Los Alamitos Elementary School - 1993, 1997
 McGaugh Elementary School - 1992, 1997, 2000, 2004, 2014 
 Rossmoor Elementary School - 1987, 1995, 2002, 2008, 2012, 2018
 Weaver Elementary School - 2002, 2006, 2010, 2014, 2018 
 McAuliffe Middle School - 1996, 2003, 2009 
 Oak Middle School - 2001, 2005, 2009
 Los Alamitos High School - 1988, 1994, 1998, 2009

California Department of Education - California Gold Ribbon Schools
 Hopkinson Elementary School 
 Lee Elementary School
 Los Alamitos Elementary School
 McGaugh Elementary School
 Rossmoor Elementary School
 Weaver Elementary School 
 McAuliffe Middle School
 Oak Middle School
 Los Alamitos High School

United States Department of Education - National Blue Ribbon Schools
 Hopkinson Elementary School - 2001, 2016 
 Lee Elementary School - 2001, 2021  
 Los Alamitos Elementary School - 2001, 2021
 Rossmoor Elementary School - 1997, 2003, 2014 
 Weaver Elementary School - 2004, 2017
 Oak Middle School - 2002, 2006
 McAuliffe Middle School - 2012
 Los Alamitos High School - 1990, 1994, 1998, with Special Honors in Arts Education - 1989, 1993, 1998

References

External links

 

School districts in Orange County, California
Los Alamitos, California
Rossmoor, California
School districts established in 1979
1979 establishments in California